Mihir Kanti Shome is a Bharatiya Janata Party politician from Assam. He has been elected in Assam Legislative Assembly election in 2016 from Udharbond constituency. He is currently residing in Kumbhirgram. His father was also a well known social worker of the area.

References 

Living people
Bharatiya Janata Party politicians from Assam
Assam MLAs 2016–2021
Assam MLAs 2021–2026
People from Cachar district
1966 births